Dorin Ioan Goga (born 2 July 1984) is a Romanian professional footballer who plays as a forward for Liga III side Sănătatea Cluj. In his career, Goga also played for teams such as Universitatea Cluj, Politehnica Timișoara or Dinamo Tbilisi, among others.

Club career

Universitatea Cluj 

Goga began his career at Universitatea Cluj, where he mainly played as winger at first. He was promoted to first team in the summer of 2003 when the club was playing in the Liga II. He scored a goal helping them achieve promotion to the Liga I, after several years of absence. While playing in the second league he had not received much attention, however, after several great games in a horrendous first half of the season for Universitatea, clubs like Politehnica Timișoara came forward and offered €1 million and 12 players in exchange for the forward's services. The offer was rejected, and Goga remained at the club until the end of the 2007–08 Liga I season. After that, he moved to Politehnica.

Politehnica Timișoara 
On 2008, Goga signed with Politehnica Timișoara. He was their goalscorer in the Europa League, scoring two goals against Ajax and Dinamo Zagreb. On 22 September he scored one goal in a 3–1 victory in the Romanian Cup against Juventus București. After a disastrous start of the season, scoring only one goal in thirteen rounds, he scored the winning goal in the 69th minute in 2–1 victory against FC Vaslui. On 26 February 2011, Goga scored the equalizer against Gaz Metan Mediaş in a 3–1 win. It was his third goal in Liga 1 this season. Dorin scored a fantastic goal in a 4–0 demolition of Universitatea Craiova. He scored again against Victoria Brăneşti and it seems that Dušan Uhrin Jr. reinvent himself again.

On 1 July 2012, Dorin Goga signed with Rapid București. He was released in December when the club was entered under administration and the new president decided to part company with the players with big contracts.

Goga's first experience abroad came in Israel, where he signed a contract for five months with Hapoel Ramat Gan. On 29 July 2013, Goga signed a two-year contract with Georgian side Dinamo Tbilisi.

Goga transferred to Chinese Super League side Harbin Yiteng on 24 June 2014. However, he had his contract terminated by mutual consent on 14 July 2014, as his family didn't support him playing in China.

International career
Goga made his international debut for Romania on 27 January 2012 in a friendly match against Turkmenistan, which Romania won 4–0.

Honours

Club
Universitatea Cluj
 Liga II: 2006–07
 Liga III: 2017–18
 Liga IV: 2016–17

FC Politehnica Timișoara
 Liga II: 2011–2012

Hapoel Ramat Gan
 Israel State Cup: 2012–13

Dinamo Tbilisi
 Umaglesi Liga: 2013–14
 Georgian Cup: 2013–14

References

External links
 
 
 
 

1984 births
Living people
People from Zalău
Association football forwards
Romanian footballers
Romania international footballers
FC Universitatea Cluj players
FC Politehnica Timișoara players
FC Rapid București players
Hapoel Ramat Gan F.C. players
FC Dinamo Tbilisi players
Zhejiang Yiteng F.C. players
ASA 2013 Târgu Mureș players
ACS Poli Timișoara players
Liga I players
Liga II players
Liga III players
Israeli Premier League players
Erovnuli Liga players
Romanian expatriate footballers
Romanian expatriate sportspeople in Israel
Expatriate footballers in Israel
Expatriate footballers in Georgia (country)
Expatriate footballers in China